Gerhard Wagner (18 August 1888 – 25 March 1939) was the first Reich Doctors' Leader (Reichsärzteführer) in the time of Nazi Germany.

Life

Pre-Nazism 
Born a surgery professor's son, he studied medicine in Munich and served as a doctor at the front in World War I (1914–1918). Among other things, he was awarded the Iron Cross, first class.

From 1919, Wagner ran his own medical practice in Munich, while also being a member of two Freikorps between 1921 and 1923, von Epp and Oberland. Just because of his Upper Silesian origins, Wagner stayed on (till 1924) as leader of the Upper Silesia German Community Associations (Deutschtumsverbände Oberschlesiens) and was chef of Munich´s division of the Loyal Upper Silesians („Verbände heimattreuer Oberschlesier"). In May 1929, he switched to the NSDAP.

1930s 
Wagner was co-founder and as of 1932 leader of the National Socialist German Doctors' League, and also functioned from 1933 as a member of the Palatinate Landtag. A year later, in 1934, Wagner was ordered to the position of Reich Doctors' Leader. Moreover, he was "The Führer's Commissioner for National Health". By 1933, he had already become leader of the Main Office for National Health, and in 1936 came his appointment as that office's Main Service Leader (Hauptdienstleiter).

In December 1935, Wagner became leader of the Reichsärztekammer (Physicians' Chamber). At the 1936 Nuremberg Rally, he discussed the racial laws. As was typical of Nazi propaganda at this time, this was more in terms of the pure and growing race than the evil of the Jews.  A shift in his political career came in 1937 when he was promoted to SA Obergruppenführer. Meanwhile, he was also commissioner for collegiate issues on Rudolf Hess's staff. Wagner died of cancer in 1939. His successor was Leonardo Conti.

References

External links
 

1888 births
1939 deaths
People from Chorzów
People from the Province of Silesia
Nazi Party politicians
Members of the Reichstag of Nazi Germany
German Army personnel of World War I
20th-century Freikorps personnel
Nazi Party officials
Physicians in the Nazi Party
Sturmabteilung officers
Deaths from cancer in Germany